Aalborg railway station ( or ) is the main railway station serving the city of Aalborg, Denmark. It is located in central Aalborg, on the southwestern edge of the city center, with entrances from John F. Kennedys Plads and access to platforms from Kildeparken.

Aalborg railway station is serving as a connecting hub for rail traffic between North Jutland and the rest of Denmark. It offers direct InterCityLyn and InterCity services to Copenhagen operated by DSB, and regional rail services to Skørping and Frederikshavn operated by Nordjyske Jernbaner. The station is located immediately adjacent to the Aalborg bus station.

History 

Aalborg railway station was inaugurated by King Christian IX of Denmark on 18 September 1869, with the opening of the new Randers–Aalborg railway line between Aalborg and Randers. Daily operations began the next day with three trains daily in each direction. In 1879, at the opening of the Limfjord Railway Bridge, Aalborg station was connected with the Vendsyssel Line from Nørresundby to Hjørring and Frederikshavn.

In 1897, the railway line from Nørresundby to Fjerritslev and in 1899 the railway line from Nørresundby via Sæby to Frederikshavn opened. Although both railway lines were located north of the Limfjord, almost all trains departed from Aalborg station. In 1899, the Aalborg-Hvalpsund railway line opened, which ran from Aalborg through the western part of the peninsula of Himmerland via Nibe to Aars (extended to Hvalpsund in 1910). Initially, the railway line's train departed from Svenstrup station, but the trains ran all the way through to and from Aalborg from 8 December 1902, when Aalborg's new railway station was opened. In 1900, the station also became the starting point for the Aalborg-Hadsund railway line, which ran from Aalborg through the eastern part of Himmerland to Hadsund.

The Sæby line was closed in 1968, while the Fjerritslev, Hvalpsund and Hadsund lines were closed in 1969.

In 2003, Aalborg station became one of the stations served by the new Aalborg Commuter Rail service, which serves seven railway stations in the Greater Aalborg area between Nørresundby in the north and Skørping in the south. In 2017, the regional rail services from Aalborg station to Skørping and Frederikshavn were transferred from DSB to the railway company Nordjyske Jernbaner.

Architecture 

The original station building from 1869 was designed by the Danish architect N.P.C. Holsøe. It was built in a mostly Neo-Renaissance style and was located approximately 300 meters north of the current station building.

In 1902, the first station building was torn down and the present station building opened. It was designed by the Danish architect Thomas Arboe. The station building was listed in 1992.

Facilities

The station has a ticket office which sells tickets for both domestic and international travel, a shop which sells food, drinks, newspapers and more. The railway station also includes a pay phone, a waiting room, luggage boxes, a photo booth, toilets and an accessible toilet. There is also an opportunity for both bicycle and car parking near the main entrance to the railway station. It is also possible to rent a car at the station or take a taxi. Aalborg Bus Terminal is also only across the street from the railway station.

Services
Aalborg station is serving as a connecting hub for rail traffic, connecting North Jutland with the rest of Denmark.

It offers direct InterCityLyn and intercity connections to Copenhagen operated by the railway company DSB, as well as regional rail services to Skørping and Frederikshavn operated by the railway company Nordjyske Jernbaner.

Cultural references
Aalborg station is seen at 0:37:00 and 0:52:19 in the 1977 Olsen-banden film The Olsen Gang Outta Sight.

References

Bibliography

External links

 Banedanmark – government agency responsible for maintenance and traffic control of most of the Danish railway network
 DSB – largest Danish train operating company
 Nordjyske Jernbaner – Danish railway company operating in North Jutland Region
 Danske Jernbaner – website with information on railway history in Denmark
 Nordjyllands Jernbaner – website with information on railway history in North Jutland

Buildings and structures in Aalborg
Railway stations in Aalborg
Railway stations opened in 1869
Ålborg station
1869 establishments in Denmark
Thomas Arboe railway stations
Railway stations in Denmark opened in the 19th century